The Miss Nicaragua 2013 pageant, was held on March 2, 2013 in Managua, after weeks of events.  At the conclusion of the final night of competition, The winner represented Nicaragua at Miss Universe 2013 where she placed top 16 in Russia. The rest of the finalists would enter in different pageants.

Placements

Special awards

 Most Beautiful Face - Carazo - Nastassja Bolívar
 Miss Congeniality - Chinandega - Katherine Molina
 Miss Photogenic - Rivas - Karla Corea
 Best Smile - Carazo - Nastassja Bolívar
 Best Hair - Managua - Luviana Torres
 Miss Fitness - Tipitapa - Celeste Castillo
 Miss Popularity -  Chinandega - Katherine Molina  (by Text votes of CLARO Telecom company)

Official Contestants

Judges

 Juan Brenes - Professional Hair Stylist
 Mariu E. Lacayo - Professional Image Consultant & Owner of Ponte Vecchio Boutique
 Adriana Dorn - Miss Nicaragua 2011
 Miguel Arrieta - Executive Director of Grupo Q Nicaragua
 Jorge Pivaral - Regional Manager of Procter & Gamble Co.
 Francina Navas Debayle - Operations Manager of Nica A Mano S.A

.

Background Music

Opening Show – Luis Pastor Gonzalez - "Nicarafricanico"
Swimsuit Competition - Kat DeLuna - "Run the Show" & "Whine up"
Evening Gown Competition – Avicii - Silhouettes

References

Miss Nicaragua
2013 in Nicaragua
2013 beauty pageants